The Arkansas Museum of Fine Arts (AMFA), formerly known as the Arkansas Arts Center, is an art museum located in MacArthur Park, Little Rock, Arkansas. The museum is undergoing an expansion and renovation. During this time, it is closed to the public. It is scheduled to be complete and ready for the grand opening at MacArthur Park in April 2023.

The museum features a permanent collection of art along with occasional special exhibitions. Other parts include a research library and rooms for several art education classes. It also includes a restaurant and gift shop. Many of the facilities such as the main atrium and the lecture hall can be rented for special events. The museum is a member of the North American Reciprocal Museum Association. In 2011, Arkansas.com named it one of the top 10 attractions in the state.

Permanent collection
The Arkansas Museum of Fine Arts's permanent collection is focused on drawings, which the museum defines as any unique work on paper, and contemporary craft objects. The collection holds objects from such historically recognized artists such as Rembrandt, Pablo Picasso, Odilon Redon, Andrew Wyeth, and Edgar Degas. The collection also represents numerous important late 20th century and contemporary artists such as Susan Hauptman, Gregory Gillespie, John Connell, William Beckman, Enrique Chagoya, Jane Frank, John Stuart Ingle, Tim Lowly, and Odd Nerdrum. One of the highlights of the Arts Center's collection is a collection of Paul Signac drawings and watercolours; many are on public display in a gallery dedicated to the Signac collection.

Regular shows
The Arkansas Museum of Fine Arts hosts the Annual Delta Exhibition, a juried exhibition of artist from Arkansas and its border states, Louisiana, Mississippi, Missouri, Oklahoma, Tennessee and Texas. The exhibition was founded in 1958 to feature contemporary work by artists born in or currently living in the Mississippi Delta region. The museum also host an Annual Collectors Show & Sale. The curators of the museum bring in works—principally drawings—from a variety of galleries from New York and around the country. This gives local collectors access to works they wouldn't normally see and the general public to see the works of a number of contemporary artists.

A competitive show of works from local school children is held annually as well. The Young Arkansas Artists show displays works from grades K-12 and awards prizes and honorable mentions for outstanding work. Schools with winning entries receive monetary awards to help promote their art programs. The Arkansas Museum of Fine Arts also organizes their National Drawing Invitational on a semi-regular basis. The show was designed to enhance to medium of drawing and to further awareness of draftsmanship as a contemporary art.

Children's theater
Recognized by The Drama League as one of the best regional theater companies in America, the Arkansas Museum of Fine Arts Children's Theatre is the only professional company in Arkansas that produces children's literary works for the stage. The Children's Theater is a very popular attraction featuring plays of classic children's stories. The Children's Theater gives children both the opportunity to witness live performances and to participate in stage productions.

Museum school
The Arkansas Museum of Fine Arts' Museum School offers courses in a variety of media. Classes in life drawing, Ceramics, photography, woodworking, and jewelry, as well as workshops by visiting artists and children's classes are available. The school holds a sale of student work the Saturday before Thanksgiving each year.

Gift shop
The gift shop in the museum includes many ceramics and hand blown glass objects. Other available items include books on various artists, including Paul Signac and Viola Frey. Also included are bronze sculptures and other sculpted items

See also

 Community Gallery at the Terry House
 MacArthur Museum of Arkansas Military History
 Old State House Museum
 William J. Clinton Presidential Library and Museum

References

External links

 
 Board of Trustees

1937 establishments in Arkansas
Art Deco architecture in Arkansas
Art museums established in 1937
Art museums and galleries in Arkansas
Arts centers in Arkansas
MacArthur Park (Little Rock, Arkansas)
Museums in Little Rock, Arkansas
Postmodern architecture in Arkansas
Theatres in Arkansas
Works Progress Administration in Arkansas